Gang Bo-yuk was the maternal grandfather of the first King of Goryeo, Taejo of Goryeo.

Family
Grandfather: Gang Ho-gyeong (강호경)
Father: Gang Chung (강충)
Daughter: Gang Jin-ui (강진의)

See also 
 Founding legends of the Goryeo royal family

Silla people